Heidi Biebl (17 February 1941 – 20 January 2022) was a German alpine skier.

Career
Biebl won gold medal in the downhill at the 1960 Winter Olympics, just three days after her 19th birthday, becoming the games' youngest gold medal winner. She also competed at the 1964 Winter Olympics, finishing fourth in both the downhill and slalom events. Biebl died on 20 January 2022, at the age of 80.

References

External links
 
 

1941 births
2022 deaths
German female alpine skiers
Olympic alpine skiers of the United Team of Germany
Olympic gold medalists for the United Team of Germany
Olympic medalists in alpine skiing
Alpine skiers at the 1960 Winter Olympics
Alpine skiers at the 1964 Winter Olympics
Medalists at the 1960 Winter Olympics
People from Oberallgäu
Sportspeople from Swabia (Bavaria)
20th-century German women